(Richard) Howel Brown  was Provost of St Mary's Cathedral, Glasgow from 1890 until 1904.

He was born in 1856 and educated at Harrow and Trinity College, Cambridge. He was ordained in 1884 and served after a curacy at St Giles in the Fields was Vicar of Holy Trinity, Lincoln's Inn Fields until his cathedral appointment.

Later he held incumbencies in Southgate and Enfield.

He died on 14 May 1928.

References

1856 births
People educated at Harrow School
Alumni of Trinity College, Cambridge
Provosts of St Mary's Cathedral, Glasgow
Scottish Episcopalian clergy
1928 deaths